Pecan City is an unincorporated community in Dougherty County, in the U.S. state of Georgia.

History
A post office called Pecan City was established in 1911, and remained in operation until 1912. The community was so named on account of its location in a pecan-growing district.

References

Unincorporated communities in Dougherty County, Georgia
Unincorporated communities in Georgia (U.S. state)